"再見不再見" (Pinyin: Zaijian Bu Zaijian, English: See You or Never) is a Mandopop song recorded by Malaysian singer-songwriter Shila Amzah for her 2016 debut Chinese album, My Journey. The song was written by Liao Yu and composed by Shila. It was released on May 28, 2015, by Shilala (HK) Limited. The writer of this song was inspired to write "See You or Never" after hearing Shila's sad love story as does she really want to leave her boyfriend or not. Shila said that this song was unique as the song hasn't an ending (the song ended with "Zaijian Bu Zaijian" , questioning herself again).

First performed during her 2015 Shila Amzah: The Symbol of Love, International Press Conference. The song was officially released at Weibo Music on 21 May 2015. She described the song as "The song is about a girl considering letting go or not her boyfriend.This is a love story. If you understand the lyrics,you'll cry".

Composition and lyrics 

At four minutes and forty seconds, "See You or Never" is a song with moderately slow and mid-fast tempo. Written by Liao Yu, the song is composed by her.

Release and promotion 

The song was first performed during her 2015 Shila Amzah: The Symbol of Love, International Press Conference at Mira Hotel, Hong Kong.
The song was also an instant commercial success, and was the first song in Shila's career to peak at number one on Billboard of Metro Radio Station Hong Kong, and the first song to hold the top spot for more than one week at Weibo Music (released on 21 May 2015) making her single had heard via Weibo Music over 1 million in just 2 days.

Live Performance 

Apart from the debut of the song during the 2015 Shila Amzah: The Symbol of Love, International Press Conference at Mira Hotel, Hong Kong, the song was also performed during the Shila Amzah Exclusive Showcase Live in Singapore.

Official Music Video 

The Official Music Video was premiered on the Astro Ria Syawal Shila Shanghai, on 22 July 2015. On 25 July 2015, she released her Official MV at her official YouTube account. A new version of the MV was released by Vie Media, Shila's International PR and Global Strategies on 23 July 2015. This MV was also directed by Raja Harith from BluBlack Production and recorded at Guangzhou, China.

Format and track listing 

Digital download

1    "再见不再见" – 4:40

References

2015 singles
2015 songs
Shila Amzah songs
Song recordings produced by Shila Amzah
Songs written by Shila Amzah